John Varvatos is an international American men’s lifestyle brand founded by John Varvatos, that designs, manufactures, and retails high-end fashion.  Varvatos has been recognized as "Menswear Designer of the Year" three times by the CFDA, and named GQ’s "Designer of the Year" in 2007. The fashion collection is distributed in 10 freestanding John Varvatos boutiques across the US, as well as in high-end department stores throughout the world. The John Varvatos Headquarters are located in New York City.

History

John Varvatos founded the company in late 1999.  Varvatos had previously been the head of menswear design at Calvin Klein, as well as the head of menswear design for all Polo Ralph Lauren brands, and was responsible for the creation of the Polo Jeans Company.

The debut clothing line was launched in 2000; a “black-less collection”, in which Varvatos went against the popular fashion trends of the time. The success of this line would garner Varvatos the Council of Fashion Designers of America's Perry Ellis Newcomer Award for Menswear.

This success was followed shortly after by the company’s first freestanding boutique, located in the SoHo neighborhood for New York City, which opened in October 2000. Today, the brand has 10 independent retail locations across the United States, and pulls over $140 million in sales per year.

After the brand generated double-digit revenue growth in 2010 and 2011, Lyndon Lea's Lion Capital purchased a majority stake in the company in March 2012, with Varvatos remaining as Chairman and Chief Creative Officer.

On May 6, 2020, due to the COVID-19 pandemic in the United States, it was reported the company was filing for Chapter 11 bankruptcy, citing $140 million in debt. In July 2020, the brand’s private equity owner, Lion/Hendrix Cayman Ltd. received court approval to acquire the fashion brand, in exchange for forgiving $76 million of the company’s debt.

Rock 'n' roll influence

John Varvatos cites rock 'n' roll as the catalyst for his fashion interests and uses rock aesthetics as the foundation of the brand's designs. The company's ad campaigns often feature musicians including Iggy Pop, Alice Cooper, Velvet Revolver, Chris Cornell, Dave Matthews, The Roots and Green Day. Music is also central to the brand’s philanthropic efforts, including the Save the Music Foundation and the annual Stuart House Benefit.

In April 2008 Varvatos opened at 315 Bowery, formerly the rock ‘n’ roll landmark club CBGB. Here, Varvatos attempted to preserve the original allure of the landmark, displaying his clothes among vintage books, high-end stereo equipment and a preserved wall of the original club, including band flyers. The opening was celebrated with a benefit party for VH1's Save the Music, with guests performances by Slash from Guns N' Roses, Tom Morello of Rage Against the Machine, Perry Farrell from Jane’s Addiction and Wayne Kramer of the MC5. Today, the location hosts free monthly concerts, with a variety of up and coming music acts, as well as established ones.

In 2009 Varvatos was recruited to host a monthly radio show, New York Nights…Direct from the Bowery, on SIRIUS XM’s The Spectrum channel. The show includes songs and interviews from various artists who have influenced Varvatos throughout his career in fashion.

In July 2014 it was announced that Ringo Starr would be modelling for the fall/winter advertising campaign, and that an associated charitable initiative would benefit The Ringo Starr Peace and Love Fund, in aid of the David Lynch Foundation. Commenting, Varvatos said, "Both inner peace and global peace are very important topics to me".

Lines

John Varvatos collection
The main collection of the brand, John Varvatos, is high-end, luxury male clothing, with rock 'n' roll influences. The line aims to create a masculine look, with a subtle edginess for the male demographic. The style aims to combine quality fabrics, design and details, without being “over-the-top.”

In 2004 John Varvatos released his first male fragrance line under the main collection, and later expanded to include their first women's fragrance in 2008.

The main collection was expanded over the years, and today includes jewelry, watches, eyewear, gloves, scarves, and other accessories.

John Varvatos Star USA Luxe
In February 2006, John Vavatos launched "John Varvatos Star USA Luxe", an in-house label aimed at a younger demographic, and at a lower price point than the main collection. The line aims to be more deconstructed, casual, and youthful.

Converse by John Varvatos
In September 2001, John Varvatos partnered with the US shoe company Converse, to create Converse by John Varvatos.

In 2004 Varvatos designed the laceless Converse Chuck Taylor slip-on. The design was widely adopted, and imitated amongst competitors.

By March 2006, Converse by John Vavatos premiered the first ready-to-wear clothing line in Converse's 100-year history. A vintage-inspired line was also designed for a younger demographic, while respecting the heritage of the Converse brand.

Other collaborations
In 2012, John Varvatos partnered with Chrysler, to design two special edition Chrysler 300C. Varvatos was recruited to create two editions, the "Limited Edition" and the "Luxury Edition", both of which feature the brand's design and name, both inside and out.

Later in 2012, Varvatos became the first ever fashion brand to partner with Patrón Spirits, for a limited edition bottle stopper. Keeping with the rock 'n' roll influences, the stopper was designed in the shape of a guitar head, complete with tuning keys.

Awards and distinctions
John Varvatos first received accolades from the Council of Fashion Designers of America (CFDA) in 2000, when he was honored with the Perry Ellis Newcomer's Award for Menswear. The following year, he won the 2001 CFDA's Designer of the Year award.

In 2005 Varvatos received the CFDA's 2005 Menswear Designer of the Year award. He competed for the top honor along with Ralph Lauren and John Bartlett for his third CFDA win.

In 2007 GQ's named Varvatos "Designer of the Year" in their 12th Annual "Men of the Year" issue.

References

External links
John Varvatos Official Website

2000s fashion
2010s fashion
Clothing brands of the United States
Fashion accessory brands
High fashion brands
Luxury brands
Privately held companies based in New York City
1999 establishments in New York City
American companies established in 1999
Clothing companies established in 1999
Retail companies established in 1999
Shoe companies of the United States
2012 mergers and acquisitions
Companies that filed for Chapter 11 bankruptcy in 2020